Ahmed Ibrahim Salman (born 22 March 2004) is an Israeli professional footballer who plays as a forward for Israeli Premier League club Maccabi Netanya and the Israel national under-19 team.

Early life
Salman was born in the Beit Safafa neighborhood of East Jerusalem, Israel, to a Muslim-Arab family.

Career
Salman signed to Hapoel Jerusalem's youth team, when he was 14. In his first season at the club, he scored 27 goals. On 31 July 2021 he made his debut in the senior team, at the 1-0 win against Beitar Jerusalem. On 21 December 2021 he scored his debut goal in the 3-1 win against Hapoel Nof HaGalil.

On 10 January 2023 signed for Maccabi Netanya.

Salman is a member of the Israel U19 since 2021.

References

External links

2004 births
Israeli Muslims
Living people
Arab citizens of Israel
Israeli footballers
Arab-Israeli footballers
Footballers from Jerusalem
Hapoel Jerusalem F.C. players
Maccabi Netanya F.C. players
Israeli Premier League players
Israel youth international footballers
Association football forwards